Trowbridge Park is an unincorporated community in Marquette Township, Marquette County, in the U.S. state of Michigan. It is also a census-designated place (CDP) for statistical purposes and has no legal status as an incorporated municipality. The CDP had a population of 2,287 at the 2020 census. The community is located within Marquette Township and borders the city of Marquette on the east and north.

Geography

Demographics

As of the census of 2000, there were 2,012 people, 758 households, and 539 families residing in the community. The racial makeup of the community was 94.93% White, 2.34% Native American, 1.19% Asian, 0.10% from other races, and 1.44% from two or more races. Hispanic or Latino of any race were 0.45% of the population.

There were 758 households, out of which 33.0% had children under the age of 18 living with them, 59.8% were married couples living together, 8.2% had a female householder with no husband present, and 28.8% were non-families. 20.6% of all households were made up of individuals, and 7.9% had someone living alone who was 65 years of age or older.  The average household size was 2.63 and the average family size was 3.06.

In the community the population was spread out, with 23.4% under the age of 18, 10.7% from 18 to 24, 29.1% from 25 to 44, 26.5% from 45 to 64, and 10.2% who were 65 years of age or older.  The median age was 38 years. For every 100 females there were 97.4 males.  For every 100 females age 18 and over, there were 97.6 males.

The median income for a household in the community was $42,422, and the median income for a family was $48,375. Males had a median income of $31,932 versus $27,200 for females. The per capita income for the community was $20,346.  About 2.1% of families and 6.1% of the population were below the poverty line, including 10.7% of those under age 18 and 12.4% of those age 65 or over.

Transportation
Indian Trails bus lines operates daily intercity bus service between Hancock and Milwaukee, Wisconsin. The line operates a stop at MarqTran's transit center in Trowbridge Park.

References

Unincorporated communities in Marquette County, Michigan
Unincorporated communities in Michigan
Census-designated places in Michigan
Census-designated places in Marquette County, Michigan